Webley Edwards (November 11, 1902 – October 5, 1977) was a World War II news correspondent, National radio host and politician.

Early life and education
Edwards was the starting quarterback at Oregon State University where he became the first student manager of campus radio while also joining the Phi Delta Theta fraternity. Edwards left Oregon State prior to graduating.

Career

Initial radio career
In 1928 Edwards relocated to Honolulu, Hawaii where he became an auto salesman and played for the Scotty Schuman's Town semi-professional football team. It was during this time he developed a keen interest in Native Hawaiian musical traditions. In 1935 he became a producer for a radio show which showcased authentic island music. The show, named Hawaii Calls debuted on July 3 of that year. The show struggled financially for the first several years.

The war years
Edwards was the station manager at KGMB in late 1941. Edwards was the first radio announcer to broadcast the attack on Pearl Harbor by the Japanese. It was he who said on air: "Attention. This is no exercise. The Japanese are attacking Pearl Harbor!....All Army, Navy and Marine personnel to report to duty". After the attack, Edwards worked as Pacific Bureau manager for CBS Radio. Among his most notable experiences was landing the first interview with Colonel Paul Tibbets, the pilot of the Enola Gay which dropped the atomic bomb over Hiroshima. Edwards, of CBS, was one of only two broadcast journalists aboard the USS Missouri during the surrender ceremony at Tokyo Bay on September 2, 1945. He was the "chief announcer" for the ceremony, Merrill Mueller of NBC was the "narrator." Edwards has the distinction of being the only broadcaster to witness the very beginning and end of the United States' involvement in World War II.

Radio career after the war
Edwards returned to radio broadcasting Hawaiian music. Hawaii Calls ran for 37 years. He wrote lyrics (with Leon Pober) to the popular song, "Pearly Shells" recorded by Burl Ives, Don Ho, Billy Vaughn and Hank Snow, to name a few. Edwards' popularity was evident in that he served in the Hawaiian Territorial & State Legislature from 1952-1966 and as a Hawaiian State Senator from 1966–1968. He died of a heart attack in 1977.

References

External links
Space Age Pop Music Profile
Yahoo Music Bio
 Tribute to Webley Elgin Edwards in Broadcasting Magazine, 18 May, 1942 - re: his broadcasts of 7 December, 1941

1902 births
1977 deaths
American radio personalities
American radio reporters and correspondents
American male journalists
Oregon State University alumni